The 2016 Porsche Carrera Cup Deutschland season was the 31st German Porsche Carrera Cup season. It began on 16 April at Oschersleben and finished on 16 October at Hockenheimring after eight double-header meetings, It was a support championship for the ADAC GT Masters Oschersleben round and Deutsche Tourenwagen Masters season.

Teams and drivers

Race calendar and results

Notes

References

External links
 
 Porsche Carrera Cup Germany Online Magazine 

Porsche Carrera Cup Germany seasons
Porsche Carrera Cup Germany